Levi LaVallee (born August 31, 1982) is an American snowmobile racer.

He won the Winter X Games VIII HillCross gold medal in 2004.
At Winter X Games XII in 2008, LaVallee won gold in the Snowmobile Speed and Style event. During Winter X Games XIII in 2009, LaVallee attempted the first double back flip in a competition. Although he was successful in completing two rotations, he failed to ride out his record setting stunt.

LaVallee won a bronze medal in Snowmobile Best Trick at Winter X Games XIV.

On Friday December 17, 2010 Lavallee suffered a broken pelvis, and punctured lung during a practice run for Red Bull New Year No Limits, and was unable to make his record setting attempt during the planned special New Years telecast.  However, during a previous practice session leading up to the event Levi managed to land a record setting 361 foot jump shattering the old record of 301 1⁄2 feet. Since the official event for the attempt did not take place the practice run has been submitted for the official world record title.

On December 31, 2011 Lavallee jumped across the San Diego Bay as part of Red Bull New Year No Limits, just over one year after he was injured in a training run preparing for the same event. Lavallee set a world record during his jump of 412 ft.

LaVallee resides in Longville, Minnesota.

References

1982 births
Living people
X Games athletes
Snowmobile racers